Kunming International Academy (Literally: Kunming International Academy; Abbreviation KIA) is a private international school in Kunming, China. Founded in 1994, it provides education to expatriate children living in Kunming in English for Pre-Junior-Kindergarten-Grade 12. The school has over 300 students from over 20 different countries enrolled.

The school uses an American curriculum and is accredited by WASC, the Western Association of Schools and Colleges. KIA graduates have been accepted at major universities worldwide.

Campus

The current campus is located within the expanse of Hu Pan Zhi Meng Residential Area in southern Kunming.

Academics

Elementary school

Senior High & Junior High School

Junior high school
Junior High School (grades 6-8) has the following characteristics:
 During the non-core enrichment classes, grade levels are mixed to create a larger junior high school community.
 Project-based learning is emphasized during science and social studies courses.
 Cross-curricular learning activities
 Emphasis of foundation-based mathematics and English language arts courses, including two "classes" of English language arts at each grade level.

Senior High School
Senior high school (grades 9-12) offers a wider range of courses and activities, including AP courses, Student Government, drama, and sports. Students may choose at least two electives in addition to the required courses. Students must complete the graduation requirements that prepare them for university study in order to graduate.

Extracurricular Activities
KIA provides a wide array of extracurricular activities to develop individual student interest and abilities. At KIA, students can choose to participate in one or more of the following:

Secondary Extracurricular Activities

Young Musicians Orchestra
The Young Musicians orchestra is an orchestra consisting of about 30 attending members who play the violin, viola, cello, flute, piano etc. They have toured Hungary, The Czech Republic, Dali, Yunnan and Chengdu, Sichuan.

Student Government Association (SGA)
 Student Government Association

Athletics
KIA, which has had an athletic program for many years, provides its students with the opportunity to participate in a variety of sports and has school teams that compete in both local and international tournaments.

External links

 Kunming International Academy (Official School Site)
 Kunming International Academy (Western Association of Schools & Colleges {WASC})

Educational institutions established in 1994
Education in Kunming
High schools in Yunnan
Private schools in China
International schools in China
1994 establishments in China